The  Edinburgh Stanford Link is a £6 million, 5 year initiative funded by Scottish Enterprise to foster collaborative research and commercialisation links between the Human Communication Research Centre at the University of Edinburgh and the Center for the Study of Language and Information at Stanford University. Starting in Feb 2002, the programme focuses on speech and language processing technology.
There are two core parts to the Link, the commercial programme and the student programme.  The former focuses on working with commercial companies and the latter focuses on fostering a culture of entrepreneurship within the University of Edinburgh.
They are located in Level 8 in Appleton Tower, Crichton Street, Edinburgh.

Activities
The Edinburgh Stanford link has two major facets; the first is working with Scottish companies to facilitate technology transfer, the second is working with the School of Informatics to foster an entrepreneurial culture. This includes teaching three entrepreneurship courses at the University of Edinburgh. 
Broken down further, the Link considers the following as their core activities:

Research in Speech and Language Processing
CEO Masterclasses; small scale, invite only Masterclasses held with a prominent technology speaker (these tend to be speakers from the Silicon Valley Speaker Series – see below)
Undergraduate and Postgraduate Entrepreneurship Courses; see Student Courses below
Industrial Placements; creating placements for staff and students for research projects
Creating links with U.S.; promotion of Scottish companies within the United States. This includes an annual trip to the MediaX conference held by Stanford University
Consultancy in Research and Development; advice on Research and Development strategies for Scottish companies
Silicon Valley Speaker Series; a series of talks by Silicon Valley Entrepreneurs, inspired by the Stanford Technology Ventures Program

Core research activities

The Link's research activities are focused around Speech and Language technologies. These include:

Speech recognition
Speech synthesis
Spoken dialogue systems
Information extraction and entity recognition
Question and answering
Summarisation

Silicon Valley Speaker Series

The Silicon Valley Speaker Series was inspired by the Stanford Technology Ventures Program. Starting in 2004, it features Silicon Valley based entrepreneurs speaking on current trends and emerging sectors. The format is an hour-long talk at 6.30pm, followed by 30 mins of questions, and an hour-long networking session in the foyer on the University of Edinburgh Business School in Bristo Square (next to Potterrow).

2005/6

2006/7

2007/8

Miscellaneous

The Link organised the first BarCamp to be held in Scotland – Barcamp 2007. The next Scottish BarCamp is to be held on 1 and 2 Feb in Edinburgh, 2008.

Team
The current team is composed of (in alphabetical order):

Aghlab Al-Attili, Research Associate
Laura Rich, ERDF Project Administrator
George Bett, Senior Developer (no more)
Margaret Caddick, Senior Secretary (no more)
Ray Carrick, Software Architect
Mike Clouser, Associate
Keith Edwards, Commercial Manager
Sue Fitt, Senior Developer
Danny Helson, Commercial Executive
John Lee, Academic Co-ordinator

See also
University of Edinburgh
University of Edinburgh School of Informatics
University of Edinburgh Business School
Scottish Enterprise

Footnotes

Information technology organisations based in the United Kingdom
Science and technology in Edinburgh
Stanford University
University of Edinburgh